John Michael Parker (born September 13, 1946) is a retired water polo player from the United States, who competed in two consecutive Summer Olympics for his native country, starting in 1968. He won the bronze medal with the Men's National Team at the 1972 Summer Olympics in Munich, West Germany.

Parker studied at Stanford University, where he was on the water polo team, and Harvard Business School.

In 1982, he was inducted into the USA Water Polo Hall of Fame.

See also
 List of Olympic medalists in water polo (men)

References

External links
 

1946 births
Living people
American male water polo players
Water polo players at the 1968 Summer Olympics
Water polo players at the 1972 Summer Olympics
Stanford Cardinal men's water polo players
Olympic bronze medalists for the United States in water polo
Place of birth missing (living people)
Medalists at the 1972 Summer Olympics
Harvard Business School alumni